The Nagano Olympic Commemorative Marathon is an annual marathon road race which takes place in mid-April in Nagano, Japan. It is an IAAF Bronze Label Road Race competition.  The Nagano Marathon has races for both elite and amateur runners. It is named in honour of the 1998 Winter Olympics which were held in Nagano.

The course has a point-to-point style and it has received accreditation from the Japan Association of Athletics Federations and AIMS. The route begins at the Nagano Sports Park and heads in a generally southern direction, passing the Zenkō-ji temple before finishing at the Nagano Olympic Stadium. The route incorporates four of the former Olympic venues into the race.

History
Francis Kibiwott and Alevtina Ivanova are the current men's and women's course record holders. The 1999 route was aided by a downhill net drop of 4.27 m/km (just under the allowable limit), while the editions from 2000–2003 had an excessive drop of over 5 m/km, making them ineligible for record performances. The current route is relatively flat, however, with the race having an overall total incline of 5 m from start to finish.

The historical root of the competition lies with the Shinmai Marathon which was first held in 1958. The marathon came under its current moniker in 1999. The elite race is international in nature, with a number of foreign runners being invited each year, although prominent Japanese athletes also take part. Kenyans have won the majority of the men's races while Russians have dominated the women's race. Nephat Kinyanjui of Kenya won the race a record three times consecutively between 2006 and 2008. Since its rebirth in 1999, only two Japanese runners have won the race (Akiyo Onishi in 1999 and Yuki Kawauchi in 2013).

Past winners
Key:

Nagano Marathon era

Shinmai Marathon era

References

List of winners
Ota, Shigenobu (2010-04-19). Nagano Olympic Memorial Marathon. Association of Road Racing Statisticians. Retrieved on 2010-04-30.

External links
Official website

Marathons in Japan
Recurring sporting events established in 1999
Sports competitions in Nagano (city)
Annual sporting events in Japan
1958 establishments in Japan